Greenland is an unincorporated community in Ross County, in the U.S. state of Ohio.

History
The name "Greenland" was assigned by the railroad company. A post office called Greenland was established in 1860, and remained in operation until 1902. Besides the post office, Greenland had a Presbyterian church.

References

Unincorporated communities in Ross County, Ohio
Unincorporated communities in Ohio
1860 establishments in Ohio